Mint River is a waterway in the U.S. state of Alaska. It rises in the York Mountains, north of the source of the Anikovik River. In its upper course, it has a narrow valley.

References

Rivers of the Seward Peninsula
Rivers of Alaska
Rivers of Nome Census Area, Alaska
Rivers of Unorganized Borough, Alaska